2015 Mongolian First League (often referred to as the 2015 Mongolian 1st League) was the first edition of Mongolian First League equivalent to the second level in the Mongolia league hierarchy.

Participating Teams

ARD Daatgal FC
Arvis FC
Baganuur KhK
Bayangol FC
Continental FC
DMYu  FC
Khangarid City
Metro FC
Mongolian Dream
Şaryn Gol FC

Promoted Teams

With 8 wins and 1 draw Continental  FC and Khangarid City  finished the competition tied. Continental were denied promotion for failing to meet coaching requirements. As a result, the Khangarid City and Bayangol FC teams were promoted to Mongolian Premier League next season.

The Continental FC team ended up ending its activities. And Khangarid City sold their Premier League license 2016 to Ulaanbaatar City and competed in 2016 as Beşiktaş.

Final classification

 1.Continental                  9   8  0  1         24
 2.Khangarid City               9   8  0  1         24  Promoted

 3.Bayangol FC                  9   7  0  2         21  Promoted
 4.Şaryn Gol                    9   7  0  2         21
 5.ARD Daatgal                  9   5  0  4         15
 6.Arvis FC                     9   3  1  5         10
 7.Baganuur KhK                 9   2  2  5          8
 8.Metro FC                     9   2  1  6          7
 9.Mongolian Dream              9   1  0  8          3
 10.DMYu  FC                    9   0  0  9          0

References

Football leagues in Mongolia
Sports leagues established in 2015